The East Bay Innovation Academy, or EBIA for short,  is a public charter middle school and a high school in Oakland, California within the Oakland Unified School District. The school was founded on October 24, 2013, and opened on August 10, 2014, by Rochelle Benning and Laurie Jones. It is notable for merging progressive ideals like project-based learning with schooling.

Demographics

East Bay Innovation Academy has around 630 students. 36% of students are hispanic, 24.8% of students are black, 20% of these students are white, 11.7% of students are two or more races, 4.6% of students are Asian.

References

2014 establishments in California
Oakland Unified School District
Educational institutions established in 2014
Charter middle schools in California